Jacob de Witt is the name of:

 Jacob de Witt (1589—1674), Dutch burgomaster of Dordrecht
 Jacob de Wit (1695–1754), Dutch interior painter from Amsterdam
 Jacob H. De Witt (1784—1867), United States Representative from New York
 Jacob De Witt (1785—1859), Quebec businessman and political figure